Alcis bastelbergeri is a moth of the family Geometridae. It is found from Central Europe, through the Ural region to the eastern Palearctic, where subspecies sachalinensis is found.

The wingspan is 38–43 mm. Adults are on wing from July to September.

The larvae feed on a wide range of plants, including Vaccinium myrtillus, Clematis vitalba, Rubus idaeus, Erica and Betula species. Adults feed on the nectar of Knautia, Senecio ovatus and Eupatorium cannabinum.

Subspecies
Alcis bastelbergeri bastelbergeri
Alcis bastelbergeri sachaliensis (Matsumura, 1911)

Etymology
It is named for the German entomologist Max Joseph Bastelberger.

References

External links
Fauna Europaea
Lepiforum.de
schmetterlinge-deutschlands.de

Boarmiini
Moths described in 1908
Moths of Asia
Moths of Europe
Taxa named by Hans Hirschke